Stade Athletique Spinalien Épinal is a French football club based in the commune of Épinal.

They currently play in the Championnat National 2. Their kit colours are yellow and blue. They play their home matches at the Stade de la Colombière in Épinal.

History
The club was founded in 1941 after the merge of two former teams, Stade Saint Michel and L'Athletique Club Spinalien and have never played in a higher division than Ligue 2.

Honours
DH Lorraine Group champions: 1998

Current squad

References

External links
 SAS Épinal Official Website

 
Association football clubs established in 1941
1941 establishments in France
Sport in Épinal
Football clubs in Grand Est